Before the introduction of the euro, the current eurozone members issued their own individual national coinage, most of which featured mint marks, privy marks and/or mint master marks. These marks have been continued as a part of the national designs of the euro coins, as well. This article serves to list the information about the various types of identifying marks on euro coins, including engraver and designer initials and the unique edge inscriptions found on the €2 coins.

Date stamps on euro coins
Since the euro was officially introduced in 1999, most of the EMU member countries began producing their coins ahead of the 2002 introduction date. There is individual national legislation in place which governs the mintage of coins issued from each country. These coinage acts regulate the coin production parameters for each country.

Mintage date
The coinage acts of countries with a mintage date stipulation specify that the year the coin is minted, regardless of when the coins are issued, should appear on each coin. Belgium, Finland, France, the Netherlands and Spain have mintage date stipulations.

Issue date
The coinage acts of countries with an issue date stipulation specify that the year the coin is issued, regardless of when the coins are minted, should appear on each coin. Austria, Germany, Greece, Ireland, Italy, Luxembourg, Portugal, San Marino and the Vatican City have issue date stipulations.

Conclusion
Since the euro was first issued in 2002, the countries which have an issue date stipulation are all dated 2002 onward, even though these coins were minted in previous years to prepare for the adoption of the euro. As a result, there are no euro coins dated 1999, 2000 and 2001 issued from countries with an issue date stipulation.
Luxembourg has no domestic mint, so their coins are minted elsewhere. Regardless of the mintage location of these coins, the issue date stipulation in their coinage act must be followed by whichever country mints their coins and the date stamp is therefore applied accordingly.
Since Monaco, San Marino and the Vatican City do not have their own coinage acts, the date stamp is applied in accordance with the coinage act of whichever country mints these coins. France produces the euro coins for Monaco and follows the mintage date stipulation; it began minting Monégasque euro coins only in 2001, since the mintage quantities were so low. Sammarinese and Vatican euro coins are minted in Italy and follow the issue date stipulation.

National identifying marks of euro coins
As per a recommendation defined by the Economic and Financial Affairs Council of the European Union, the national designs of each member's euro coin should contain a national identification in the form of spelling or abbreviation of the country's name. Of the fifteen members of the Eurozone at the time these recommendations were made, five national designs—those of Austria, Belgium, Finland, Germany and Greece—did not meet the criteria outlined. Of these five, two (Finland in 2007 and Belgium in 2008) have changed or amended their design to follow these recommendations, and the other three are expected to follow suit in the coming years.

Mint marks

The use of mint marks on euro coins takes one of these three forms:
a single letter representing a city or country
the abbreviation of the country's mint
the symbol of the country's mint

Mint master marks and privy marks
Mint master marks or privy marks are symbols representing directors, chief engravers or chief executive officers of mints.

Belgium
The directors of the Monnaie Royale de Belgique/Koninklijke Munt van België (Royal Belgian Mint) in Brussels uses mint master's marks on all €2 commemorative coins and on all Belgian euro coins with a datestamp from 2008 onwards minted at this location.

Finland
The director of the Rahapaja Oy (Mint of Finland, LTD.) mint in Helsinki-Vantaa used a mint master's mark on Finnish euro coins minted at this location with the date stamp between 1999 and 2006.

France
The directors of Monnaie de Paris in Pessac use mint master's marks on all French euro coins minted at this location.

Luxembourg
Luxembourg euro coins dated 2002 were minted in the Netherlands in 2000 and thus bear the mint master mark of E. J. van Schauwenburg, Temporary Director of the Utrecht Mint during the year of coin production. The Coinage Act of Luxembourg stipulates that national coins cannot have a date stamp prior to the year of issue. Therefore, Luxembourg euro coins bear the mint master mark of the Temporary Director at the time of minting, despite the date on the coins.

Coins dated 2003–2004 bear the mint master mark of Maarten Brouwer, Director of the Utrecht Mint from 2003–2015.
Luxembourgian euro coins dated 2005–2006 were produced at Rahapaja Oy (Mint of Finland), in Helsinki-Vantaa, Finland. Since the mint director does not affix a mint master mark to coins in production at that location, these coins do not bear a mint master mark but an S and the logo of the 'Suomen Rahapaja' instead. 

Luxembourg euro coins dated 2007-2008 were produced at Monnaie de Paris, in Pessac, France and bear the mint master mark of Hubert Larivière, Director of the Paris Mint.
As of 2009, coins are again minted at the Royal Dutch Mint in Utrecht, the Netherlands. Until 2015 it was again the mint master mark of Maarten Brouwer. From 2016-2017 Kees Bruinsma was the Temporary Director of the Utrecht Mint.

Monaco
Monegasque euro coins are produced by Monnaie de Paris, in Pessac, France beginning in 2001 and thus bear the mint master mark of Gérard Buquoy, Serge Levet, Hubert Larivière and Yves Sampo Directors of the Mint from 2001–2002, 2003, 2004–2010 and 2011–present respectively.

Netherlands
The mint masters of the Koninklijke Nederlandse Munt (Royal Dutch Mint) in Utrecht use mint master's marks on all Dutch euro coins minted at this location.

Slovenia
Slovenian euro coins dated 2008 were produced at Koninklijke Nederlandse Munt in Utrecht, the Netherlands, and bear the mint master mark of Maarten Brouwer, director of the Royal Dutch Mint from 2003 until 2015.

Designer, sculptor and engraver initials on euro coins
Each country had the opportunity to design its own national side of the euro coin. Most coins bear the initials or the name of the designer somewhere in the national design. For example, all eight motives of the common reverse sides of the euro coins bear the stylised initials "LL" for Luc Luycx.

Designer, sculptor and engraver initials on standard euro coins

Designer, sculptor and engraver initials on €2 commemorative coins

€2 edge inscriptions
With each member of the Eurozone comes a set of individual coin designs. Included in the individuality of the national obverse face of the euro coins, whose design is left to the member states, is the edge of the €2 coin. Each member was allowed to design a unique inscription that would appear on the €2 coin's edge. Some of these edge inscriptions are carried over from the coins of the yielded currencies in circulation prior to the introduction of the euro.

Standard issue €2 edge inscriptions

Commemorative issue €2 edge inscriptions
Generally the edge inscription of a €2 commemorative coin does not change from the standard issue counterpart. There are a few exceptions.

In 2008, a European Commission's recommendation was approved in which the following was stated: "The legend engraved on the edge of the commemorative euro coins intended for circulation must be the same as that on the normal euro coins intended for circulation." In 2012, a European Regulation was approved in which, with a binding nature, the previous restriction was specified.

Notes

References

 
 
 
 
 

Euro coins
Euro commemorative coins
Currency production